Barry Goralnick is an American designer working in the fields of architecture and interior design, and the design of home furnishings that include furniture, lighting, and carpets.  He is the founder and principal of Goralnick Architecture & Design, based in New York, NY.

Goralnick is also an established theatre producer, and an active member of New York's theatre community.

Biography
Goralnick was born in Swampscott, Massachusetts, in 1955.  He graduated from Swampscott High School in 1973 and earned a bachelor's degree from Brandeis University in 1977– where he majored in English Literature, minored in Fine Art, and graduated magna cum laude.  He studied English Literature and Architecture History at the University of Reading in England in 1976. He received a master's degree from Harvard University’s Graduate School of Design in 1981.

Architecture and design career

Goralnick commenced his design career in 1981, working with architects Stephen Potters and Emilio Ambasz.  He further honed his skills with esteemed Modernist architect Wayne Berg, working on a mix of residential and fashion-centric projects that would prove essential to his career development. Clients there included Alan Alda, Bill Blass, Donna Karan, and John Gutfreund. He later worked for legendary architect Robert A.M. Stern.  Goralnick opened his own firm in 1984.

He has worked on projects that include residential, corporate, and religious applications, with notable clients including Emmy Award-winning actor John Lithgow, humorist Lisa Birnbach, author Erica Jong and producer Aaron Russo.

In addition to his residential projects, Goralnick has designed furniture and lighting products that are marketed under his own name. The collections of hand-knotted and Tibetan carpets he designed have been produced with established carpet manufacturer Stark Carpet, and are sold and distributed worldwide. He has designed a lighting collection for Visual Comfort Lighting, a furniture collection for Ferrell + Mittman, a furniture collection for Vanguard Furniture, and has new lines debuting in 2018 that will also include tile and plumbing fixtures.

Theatre career
In addition to his established design career, Goralnick – an avid theatre enthusiast – founded the New York-based Fresh Produce, Inc. theatre production company in 2001.  The company's mission is to produce new musicals and plays by American writers, and has recently produced titles including Eve-olution (by Hilary Illick and Jennifer Krier starring Law & Order’s Mary McCormack and The Cosby Show’s Sabrina Le Beauf), The Irish Curse (by Martin Casella), Saint Heaven (starring Tony-winner Chuck Cooper, Tony nominee Montego Glover and Deborah Gibson, book by Martin Casella; music and lyrics by Keith Gordon), and Scituate (by Martin Casella). He co-produced The Report by Martin Casella at the New York Fringe Festival in 2015, where it won the Best Writing Award. He also co-produced a London reading of The Report in 2016.

He was on the Board of the Edge Theater Company and studied at the Commercial Theater Institute.

Recent awards

2016 Interior Design Magazine BoY - Best of Year Award.
2017 New York Cottages & Gardens Award IDA Innovation in Design Award -  Reader's Choice.

Media coverage
Goralnick and his design work have been featured in print publications, including the following:

Architectural Digest
House Beautiful
Interior Design
Decor
Traditional Home
Metropolitan Home
Elle Decor
Vanity Fair
Country Living

References

1955 births
Living people
American interior designers
People from Swampscott, Massachusetts
American designers
Harvard Graduate School of Design alumni
Brandeis University alumni
Alumni of the University of Reading